Come By Chance Refinery was a crude oil refinery operated by North Atlantic Refining in Come By Chance, Newfoundland and Labrador, Canada. The plant is undergoing conversion to a biofuel operation.

History
The refinery was built by John Shaheen's Shaheen Resources from 1971 to 1973, with the help of British company Procon Limited, for $155 million. The refinery began operation in December 1973 until the refinery went bankrupt in 1976, with Shaheen Resources owing about $500 million. After four years of inactivity, the refinery was purchased by Petro-Canada for $10 million in 1980, but decided against reactivation, and instead sold the refinery to Bermuda-based refinery Newfoundland Processing Ltd. for $1 in 1986, which reopened it the following year.

In August 1994, the Vitol Group purchased the refinery and the operating company North Atlantic Refining was founded. In 2014, it was acquired by SilverRange Capital Partners, a New York-based alternative asset manager. On May 28, 2020, Irving Oil announced that it was in negotiations to purchase the refinery. On October 5, 2020, the sale to Irving Oil collapsed and it was announced that the Come By Chance refinery would close permanently.

In November 2021, the U.S. private equity group Cresta Fund Management purchased a controlling stake of the idling refinery and announced plans to convert the plant to a biofuel operation. As part of the acquisition, the refinery was renamed to Braya Renewable Fuels.

On September 2, 2022. There was a massive explosion in the refinery which injured 8 workers, one of whom died in hospital on October 15th. The cause of the explosion is currently under investigation.

References

External links
North Atlantic Refining

Oil refineries in Canada
Buildings and structures in Newfoundland and Labrador